Bhaskaran is a given name or a patronymic surname with its origin in Sanskrit meaning "the sun". Notable people with the surname include:

Bhaskaran Ramprakash (born 1966), Indian cricketer
K. Bhaskaran, Indian Carnatic music flautist
M. Bhaskaran, Indian Communist politician
Nellikode Bhaskaran, Indian Malayalam actor
P. Bhaskaran (1924–2007), Malayalam poet and film song lyricist
Vasudevan Baskaran, Indian hockey player

See also
Boss Engira Bhaskaran, a 2010 Tamil romantic comedy film
Bhaskar (disambiguation)
Bhāskara (disambiguation)
Bhaskararaya
Bhaskarnagar

Indian surnames